Albrecht Goes (22 March 1908 – 23 February 2000) was a German writer and Protestant theologian.

Life
Albrecht Goes was born in 1908 in the Protestant rectory in Langenbeutingen. He spent his childhood there, but his mother died in 1911 and in 1915 he went to live with his grandmother in Berlin-Steglitz. He went to school there until 1919, when he moved to a school in Göppingen. In 1922 he entered the theological seminary in Urach, and from 1922–1923 he attended the seminary in Schöntal. His room-mate there was Gerd Gaiser. He passed his university exams and in 1924 entered the advanced seminary in Urach.

In 1926 he read German studies and History in Tübingen, then switched to Theology. In 1928 he went to Berlin to continue his Theology studies, and there he met and was influenced by Romano Guardini. In 1930 Goes was ordained for the Evangelical Church in Württemberg as a parson in Tuttlingen's main church, and in 1931 became a vicar at the Martinskirche in Stuttgart. In 1933 he began his first rectorate in Unterbalzheim in Illertissen. In the same year he married Elisabeth Schneider, with whom he had three daughters: Christin, Brigitte and Rose. In 1938 he took up a rectorate in Gebersheim (which today is a part of the city of Leonberg).

His involvement with the German army during the Second World War began when he was conscripted in 1940. He was trained as a radio operator and sent to Romania. From 1942 to 1945 he was a clergyman in hospitals and prisons in Russia, Poland, Hungary and Austria. After the war he returned to his ministry in Gebersheim, and he stayed there until he quit the Church in 1953 to become a full-time writer; from then on he preached twice a month. In 1954 he moved back to Stuttgart-Rohr. He campaigned against the rearmament of Germany by, for example, adding his signature to the 'German Manifesto' of the Paul's Church Movement (along with, among others, Gustav Heinemann). In 1958 he was inaugurated into the Berlin Academy of Arts.

Goes's first volumes of poetry were Verse in 1932 and Der Hirte (The Herdsman) in 1934. The story Unruhige Nacht (Restless Night) was published in 1950. The novel Das Brandopfer (The Burnt Offering) examined the Holocaust during the Third Reich from the perspective of an ordinary butcher's wife, who eventually tries to find justice by sacrificing herself. The book, written in simple language, is considered a significant contribution to the dialogue and reconciliation between Jews and Christians in the post-Third Reich era. This was recognised in 1978 when Goes was awarded the Buber-Rosenzweig Medal. Both Unruhige Nacht and Das Brandopfer were turned into films. Unruhige Nacht was translated into English as Arrow to the Heart and adapted for broadcast by BBC Television in the United Kingdom in 1952.

Albrecht Goes's work is often compared with that of Albrecht Haushofer, Reinhold Schneider, Rudolf Alexander Schröder and Gertrud von Le Fort. His 100th birthday was celebrated with new scholarly books and editions of his works, and an extensive programme of events.

Albrecht Goes was buried at the Prag Cemetery in Stuttgart on 28 February 2000.

Works
 Verse; Stuttgart 1932
 Der Hirte. Gedichte; Leipzig 1934
 Heimat ist gut. Zehn Gedichte; Hamburg 1935
 Lob des Lebens. Betrachtungen und Gedichte; Stuttgart 1936
 Vergebung; 1937
 Der Zaungast; 1938
 Der Nachbar. Gedichte; Berlin 1940
 Gelöbnis; Nachtwache, Fleckfieberlazarett, Frühling 1943
 Die guten Gefährten. Begegnungen; 1942
 Die Begegnung. Zehn Gedichte; (Privatdruck) 1944
 Der Weg zum Stall; 1946
 Die Herberge. Gedichte; Berlin 1947
 Unruhige Nacht; 1950
 Das Brandopfer. Erzählung, 1954
 Der Gastfreund. Prosa und Verse; Berlin (Ost) 1958
 Das Sankt Galler Spiel von der Kindheit Jesu, erneuert; 1959
 Zehn Gedichte; Frankfurt a.M. 1961
 Die Gabe und der Auftrag; Berlin (Ost) 1962
 Aber im Winde das Wort. Prosa und Verse aus zwanzig Jahren; Frankfurt a.M. 1963
 Das Löffelchen; 1965
 Tagwerk. Prosa und Verse; Frankfurt a.M. 1976
 Lichtschatten du. Gedichte aus fünfzig Jahren; Frankfurt a.M. 1978
 Erzählungen, Gedichte, Betrachtungen; Frankfurt a.M. 1986
 Keine Stunde schwindet. Eine Auswahl; Berlin (Ost) 1988
 Mit Mörike und Mozart. Studien aus fünfzig Jahren; 1991
 Dunkle Tür, angelehnt. Gedanken an der Grenze des Lebens; 1997
 Das Erstaunen. Begegnung mit dem Wunderbaren; 1998
 Lebensspur. Gedichte von Albrecht Goes und Aquarelle von Andreas Felger; Präsenz Kunst & Buch, 2007

Honours
 1958: Willibald Tirkheimer-Medaille for services to culture and literature
 1959: Federal Cross of Merit awarded by Theodor Heuss
 1962: Heinrich-Stahl-Preis from the Jewish community of Berlin
 1972: Guest of Honour at the Villa Massimo in Rome
 1974: Honorary degree from the Evangelisch Theologische Universität Mainz
 1977: Order of Merit of Baden-Württemberg
 1978: Buber-Rosenzweig Medal (for the novel Das Brandopfer)
 1979: Professorship awarded by Lothar Späth, the minister-president of Baden-Württemberg
 1981: Albrecht-Goes-Straße was named after him in Langenbeutingen
 1983: Citizen's Medal for special services to the city of Stuttgart
 1991: Otto-Hirsch Medal from the city of Stuttgart
 1994: Literature Prize from the city of Stuttgart
 1998: Honours from the cities of Stuttgart and Leonberg, the Protestant Academy of Bad Boll, and the monastery in Schöntal to mark his 90th birthday
 2000: Albrecht-Goes-Platz was named after him in Stuttgart, and there were celebrations of his life and work in Marbach and Leonberg
 2001: A memorial stone was placed in front of the house in which he was born in Langenbeutingen, inscribed with lines from his poem Die Schritte (The Steps)
 2004: Albrecht-Goes-Stube (The Albrecht Goes Room), a small museum, was opened in Langenbeutingen
 Bas-relief of Goes by Hermann Koziol is unveiled in the Place of Remembrance for the Fallen at Bretzfeld cemetery
 2008: A series of events take place at around twenty locations in Baden-Württemberg and Leipzig to mark Goes's one hundredth birthday
 2008: Commemorative plaque unveiled in the Protestant diocese of Tübingen

References

External links
 

1908 births
2000 deaths
Knights Commander of the Order of Merit of the Federal Republic of Germany
German-language poets